The Red Hill mining project is a gold deposit in Eureka County, in central Nevada, adjacent to the Goldrush and Four Mile deposits. Owned by Barrick Gold (61.5%) and Newmont (38.5%), the deposits are being developed as an underground mining project accessed by decline. Barrick is the project operator.

References

External links 

 USGS Online Spatial Data

Gold mines in Nevada
Barrick Gold
Newmont
Geography of Eureka County, Nevada